= Oil Ridge =

Coordinates: 39°09′33″N 81°07′42″W

Oil Ridge is a ridge in the U.S. state of West Virginia.

Oil Ridge was named for oil production in the area.
